Le Fossé is a former commune in the Seine-Maritime department in the Normandy region in northern France. On 1 January 2016, it was merged into the commune of Forges-les-Eaux.

Geography

Population

Places of interest
 The church of St.Pierre & St.Paul, dating from the sixteenth century.

See also
Communes of the Seine-Maritime department

References

Former communes of Seine-Maritime